Chenarlaq (also Romanized as Chenārlaq; also known as Chenārlīq) is a village in Khvoresh Rostam-e Jonubi Rural District, Khvoresh Rostam District, Khalkhal County, Ardabil Province, Iran. At the 2006 census, its population was 569, in 133 families.

References 

Towns and villages in Khalkhal County